Johnny Rapid (born Hylan Anthony Taylor; August 24, 1992) is an American gay pornographic film actor.

Since 2010, he has appeared in over 200 pornographic scenes for Men.com studio. He now runs his own site.

Early life
Hylan Anthony Taylor was born on August 24, 1992 in Conyers, Georgia, near Atlanta.

As a teenager, he was a car enthusiast, and a boxer. He graduated from Rockdale District School in 2010.

When he lost his job in the middle of summer he thought that playing in porn films could be a good way to make money quickly.

Gay pornographic career
Before building his career for Men.com, he also played several scenes for Boys First Time and Bukkake Boys Studios. For the first, he appeared in a scene called Rapid Fire released December 23, 2011.

In January 2015, Rapid publicly offered $2 million to Canadian singer Justin Bieber to shoot a pornographic scene with him. The singer never answered. Rapid went on to play Bieber in a porn parody.

In 2017, he was one of the most sought after actors on Pornhub website in the gay porn category.

By April 2021, Rapid’s pornographic film work has been prolific and has included doing 300+ scenes with over 180 different male pornographic actors.

Personal life
Discreet about his private life, Rapid previously defined himself as heterosexual and thus a gay for pay actor; however, he now identifies as bisexual.

References

External links
 
 

1992 births
American male pornographic film actors
American male film actors
Bisexual male pornographic film actors
American bisexual actors
Living people
People from Conyers, Georgia
Male actors from Atlanta
American male adult models
American actors in gay pornographic films
LGBT adult models
LGBT people from Georgia (U.S. state)
21st-century American male actors